Pierino Prati (13 December 1946 – 22 June 2020) was an Italian footballer who played mainly as a forward. He began his career with Salernitana, and later played for several other Italian clubs, including a successful spell with AC Milan, with whom he won several titles. As of 2022, he is the last person to score a hat-trick in the European cup's final, having done so in 1969, against Ajax Amsterdam.

At international level, Prati represented Italy on 14 occasions between 1968 and 1974, scoring seven goals; he was a member of the teams that won UEFA Euro 1968 on home soil, and which reached the 1970 FIFA World Cup Final. He also had a brief spell with Rochester Lancers in the NASL in 1979.

Club career
Also known as "Pierino the pest", Prati began his career playing in Serie C1 with Salernitana, winning the title and promotion to Serie B during the 1965–66 season. He is mostly remembered for his highly successful and prolific stint with Italian club AC Milan under manager Nereo Rocco in the 60s and 70s, during which he achieved great international and domestic success, winning a Serie A title, a European Cup, two Cup Winners' Cups, an Intercontinental Cup, and two Coppa Italia titles, forming an excellent partnership with Gianni Rivera.

He made his Serie A debut with the club during the end of the 1965–66 season, on 18 September 1966, in a 2–1 win over Venezia, but was briefly loaned to Serie B club Savona during the 1966–67 season. He later helped Milan to win the 1967–68 Serie A title, finishing the season as the top goalscorer in the Italian league, with 15 goals. He was also notably part of their European Cup victory in 1969, scoring a hat-trick in the 4–1 defeat of Ajax in the final, and six goals in total throughout the competition. He is the last man to have scored a hat-trick in the Champions League/European Cup Final. Ferenc Puskás (twice) and Alfredo Di Stefano (both of Real Madrid) are the only other players to have achieved this.

Overall, he played for 12 seasons (233 games, 100 goals) in the Italian Serie A with Milan, Roma and Fiorentina. He also played for Savona once again in Serie C2 in his later career, as well as the Rochester Lancers in the NASL.

International career
Prati also played for the Italy national football team. He was most notably a member of the Italian side that won the 1968 UEFA European Football Championship on home soil, during which he made his debut on 6 April, scoring a goal in a 3–2 loss against Bulgaria in the first leg of the quarter-finals, and another in the 2–0 victory in the return leg. He played the first final match alongside Pietro Anastasi, but was replaced by Luigi Riva in the re-match, the striker who would often keep him on the bench for Italy. With his national team, Prati also reached the final of the 1970 FIFA World Cup, losing out to Brazil. In total, he was capped 14 times for the national side between 1968 and 1974, scoring 7 times.

Style of play
A talented and opportunistic player, with an eye for goal, Prati was capable of playing anywhere along the front-line, as a striker, supporting forward, and as a winger. At Milan, he was often deployed on the left wing due to his pace, technique, distribution, and was also known for his powerful and accurate shot from both inside and outside the penalty area, as well as his ability in the air.

Personal life
Prati's son, Cristiano, is also a footballer, who plays in the lower Italian divisions.

Death
Prati died on 22 June 2020, after being ill for some time.

Career statistics

Club
Source

International
Source

Honours

Club
Salernitana
Serie C1: 1965–66

AC Milan
Serie A: 1967–68
Coppa Italia: 1971–72, 1972–73
European Cup: 1968–69
European Cup Winners' Cup: 1967–68, 1972–73
Intercontinental Cup: 1969

International
Italy
UEFA European Championship: 1968
FIFA World Cup: runner-up 1970

Individual
Serie A Top Goalscorer: 1967–68 (15 goals)
AC Milan Hall of Fame

References

External links
 

1946 births
2020 deaths
People from Cinisello Balsamo
Italian footballers
Italy international footballers
UEFA Euro 1968 players
1970 FIFA World Cup players
Serie A players
Serie B players
Serie C players
U.S. Salernitana 1919 players
A.C. Milan players
Savona F.B.C. players
A.S. Roma players
ACF Fiorentina players
Italian expatriate footballers
Expatriate soccer players in the United States
Italian expatriate sportspeople in the United States
North American Soccer League (1968–1984) players
Rochester Lancers (1967–1980) players
UEFA European Championship-winning players
Association football forwards
UEFA Champions League winning players
Footballers from Lombardy
Sportspeople from the Metropolitan City of Milan